George Goyoslav Karamatic, Jr. (February 22, 1917 – December 5, 2008) was an American football running back in the National Football League for the Washington Redskins.  He played college football at Gonzaga University and was drafted in the first round (eighth overall) of the 1938 NFL Draft by the New York Giants. Karamatic died in Santa Maria, California.

External links

1917 births
2008 deaths
People from Aberdeen, Washington
Sportspeople from Santa Maria, California
Players of American football from Washington (state)
American football running backs
Gonzaga Bulldogs football players
Washington Redskins players